Evelyn Cecil Muschamp d’Assis Fonseca (1899 – 1993) was a British dipterist. He was responsible for formally naming a number of fly species, including:

 Dolichopus subpennatus
 Fannia collini
 Fannia pseudonorvegica
 Fannia subatripes
 Alliopsis similaris
 Heterostylodes caledonicus

He authored two volumes in the Royal Entomological Society of London's Handbooks for the Identification of British Insects series:

 Handbooks for the Ident. of British Insects. Cyclorrhapha Calyptrata section (b) Muscidae (1968)
 Handbooks for the Ident. of British Insects. Brachycera : Dolichopodidae (1978)

His extensive Diptera collection is now in the Hope Entomological Collections of the Oxford University Museum of Natural History.

Fonseca's seed fly, the rarest endemic insect in the UK, is named after Fonseca, who described the type specimen.

External links

British entomologists
Dipterists
1899 births
1993 deaths
20th-century British zoologists